Dog Park Dissidents is an American queercore punk rock band formed in 2017. Its five members are based out of New Orleans, Louisiana; Long Island, New York; and Philadelphia, Pennsylvania.

History 
Dog Park Dissidents was founded in 2017 by vocalist Zac Xeper and guitarist Jon Greco, who recorded the band's first song "Queer As In Fuck You" for a planned anti-Trump sampler compilation. After the song's viral success, Xeper and Greco went on to produce and self-release the 2018 EP Sexual and Violent, featuring a remastered and lyrically altered version of "Queer" along three other new songs.

In 2019, ahead of their second EP High Risk Homosexual Behavior, Dog Park Dissidents played and headlined their first live show in Long Island, New York, playing with a lineup that included drummer Mike Costa and bassist Joe Bove of The Arrogant Sons of Bitches. Bove would go on to record bass for High Risk Homosexual Behavior, and Costa would later enter the recording studio for the band's 2021 release ACAB For Cutie.

Along with the release of ACAB For Cutie, the band announced they had signed to Say-10 Records, with a planned album-length re-release of their 3 EPs remixed by We Are the Union's Reade Wolcott and remastered by Jack Shirley. Later in 2021, Philadelphia-based Bove officially joined the band as bassist.

Following a run of shows in 2022, touring drummer Zeke Xander and touring guitarist Skylar Stravinsky officially joined the band as permanent members, bringing the total of New Orleans-based band members to three.

The band has a following within the furry fandom, playing the likes of Furrydelphia in August, 2022.  In September, 2022, the band gained notoriety after a planned outdoor show with Pansy Division was shut down by police due to permitting issues. Xander, acting as event coordinator, alleged that the Southern Decadence show was cut short right as Dog Park Dissidents were supposed to begin playing, after the New Orleans City Constable threatened them and Xeper with arrest.

Musical style 
Critics have described Dog Park Dissidents as "angry queer punk rock" with glam influences. Xeper describes the band's musical style as "genrequeer", explaining they “like to keep things in the wheelhouse of punk rock but mixing in whatever else feels right… genre mixing is an inherently queer way of doing music.”

The band's lyrical themes are often political, and written from a queer anarchist perspective. They have written songs based on the Black Orchid Collective's essay "Queer Liberation is Class Struggle", and their lyrics touch on the intersection of queer liberation with anti-capitalism, loss of queer spaces due to gentrification, the climate crisis, feeling alienated from liberal identity politics, and criticism of rights-based measures of social progress.

Band members 
Current members

 Zac Xeper – lead vocals (2017–present)
 Jon Greco – guitar, vocals (2017–present)
 Joe Bove – bass (2021–present)
 Zeke Xander – drums (2022–present)
 Skylar Stravinsky – guitar (2022–present)

Discography 
Extended plays

 Sexual and Violent (2018) - Self-released on Nerd Cave Recordings
 High Risk Homosexual Behavior (2019) - Self-released on Nerd Cave Recordings
 ACAB for Cutie (2021) - Self-released on Nerd Cave Recordings

Singles

 "Queer as in Fuck You" (2017) - Self-released
 "Toxic" (2019) - Self-released as a single through Bandcamp; part of High Risk Homosexual Behavior on streaming platforms
 "Gift Wrap" (2022) - Say-10 Records

Compilations

 Never Erased (2022) - Say-10 Records feat. "S*xual"

Music Videos

 "Host" (2020) from High Risk Homosexual Behavior

References

Queercore groups
LGBT-themed musical groups
Musical groups established in 2017
Musical groups from New Orleans
Punk rock groups from New York (state)
Musical groups from Long Island
American punk rock groups